Crash Club was a multiplayer online video game developed by Prettygreat.

Gameplay
Players race around a large city that houses several houses, a lighthouse, beaches, a satellite dish, various coffee shops, a gas station, water tower, and a metal crane. The objective is to work your way up the leaderboard by hitting everything in sight to obtain points while avoiding and attacking other vehicles that do the same. As players do this, they earn experience points and gold coins. They also have a chance to uncover one of five gems.

As players hit structures, they can get up to five tokens which can be used to obtain weapons, upgrades, and power-ups by entering "Stop-N-Go" buildings scattered around the map. Once the player reaches the top of the leaderboard, their vehicle turns into a monster truck. Smashing into objects while driving the truck results provides double the number of points. Alternatively, they can wreck opponents vehicles using several weapons including Peashooters, Blasters, Rockets, Zap Cannons, and Galaxy Guns. Players are also equipped with up to three turbos, which they can use to escape danger. Once a player's vehicle is wrecked, they are out of the game.

Before each game, players can upgrade their vehicles, sell, or customize them with a variety of paints, decals, wheels, antennas, and horns. They also have an opportunity to get three tokens or activate a shield, with the latter requiring them to watch an advertisement.

Reception
Gamezebo gave the game 3/5 stars, praising it for its simple controls and the many customization options, while criticizing it for its lack of information and repetitiveness. Edamame awarded the game an A+.

References

External links
 

2017 video games
Vehicle simulation MOGs
Video games developed in Australia